Knocks may refer to:
Knocks (Aghalurcher), a townland in County Fermanagh, Northern Ireland
Knocks (Clones), a townland in County Fermanagh, Northern Ireland
 The Knocks, an American electronic music duo

See also
 Knock (disambiguation)
 Knox (disambiguation)
 Nock (disambiguation)